This is a list of records for the New South Wales cricket team.

First-class records

Individual records

Most matches played

Most catches (fielder)

Most dismissals

Team records

Highest team totals

Lowest team totals

Greatest win margins (by innings)

Greatest win margins (by runs)

Batting records

Highest individual scores

Most career runs

Most runs in a season

Highest batting averages

Most centuries

Bowling records

Most career wickets

Most wickets in a season

Best career average

Best figures in an innings

Best figures in a match

List A records

Individual records

Most matches played

Most catches (fielder)

Most dismissals

Team records

Highest team totals

Greatest win margins (by runs)

Batting records

Highest individual score

Most career runs

Highest batting averages

New South Wales